In the kingdom of England, a feudal barony or barony by tenure was the highest degree of feudal land tenure, namely per baroniam (Latin for "by barony"), under which the land-holder owed the service of being one of the king's barons. The duties owed by and the privileges granted to feudal barons are not exactly defined, but they involved the duty of providing soldiers to the royal feudal army on demand by the king, and the privilege of attendance at the king's feudal court, the precursor of parliament.

If the estate-in-land held by barony contained a significant castle as its caput baroniae and if it was especially large – consisting of more than about 20 knight's fees (each loosely equivalent to a manor) – then it was termed an honour. The typical honour had properties scattered over several shires, intermingled with the properties of others. This was a specific policy of the Norman kings, to avoid establishing any one area under the control of a single lord. Usually, though, a more concentrated cluster existed somewhere. Here would lie the caput (head) of the honour, with a castle that gave its name to the honour and served as its administrative headquarters. The term honour is particularly useful for the eleventh and twelfth centuries, before the development of an extensive peerage hierarchy.

This type of barony is different from the type of feudal barony which existed within a county palatine. A county palatine was an independent franchise so its baronies were considered the highest rank of feudal tenure in the county and not the kingdom, such as the barony of Halton within the Palatinate of Chester.

Creation
William the Conqueror established his favoured followers as barons by enfeoffing them as tenants-in-chief with great fiefdoms to be held per baroniam, a largely standard feudal contract of tenure, common to all his barons. Such barons were not necessarily always from the greater Norman nobles, but were selected often on account of their personal abilities and usefulness. Thus, for instance, Turstin FitzRolf, the relatively humble and obscure knight who had stepped in at the last minute to accept the position of Duke William's standard-bearer at the Battle of Hastings, was granted a barony which comprised well over twenty manors.

Lands forming a barony were often located in several different counties, not necessarily adjoining. The name of such a barony is generally deemed to be the name of the chief manor within it, known as the Caput, Latin for "head", generally assumed to have been the seat or chief residence of the first baron. So, for instance, the barony of Turstin FitzRolf became known as the barony of North Cadbury, Somerset.

The exact date of creation of most feudal baronies cannot be determined, as their founding charters have been lost. Many of them are first recorded in the Domesday Book survey of 1086.

Servitium debitum
The feudal obligation imposed by the grant of a barony was termed in Latin the servitium debitum or "service owed" and was set as a quota of knights to be provided for the king's service. It bore no constant relation to the amount of land comprised by the barony, but was fixed by a bargain between the king and the baron.

It was at the discretion of the baron as to how these knights were found. The commonest method was for him to split his barony into several fiefs of between a few hundred acres possibly up to a thousand acres each, into each of which he would sub-enfeoff one knight, by the tenure of knight-service. This tenure gave the knight use of the fief and all its revenues, on condition that he should provide to the baron, now his overlord, 40 days of military service, complete with retinue of esquires, horses and armour. The fief so allotted is known as a knight's fee. Alternatively the baron could keep the entire barony, or a part of it, in demesne, that is to say "in-hand" or under his own management, using the revenues it produced to buy the services of mercenary knights known as "stipendiary knights".

Under- and over-enfeoffment
Where a baron had sub-enfeoffed fewer knights than required by the servitium debitum, the barony was said to be "under-enfeoffed", and the balance of knights owing had to be produced super dominium, that is "on the demesne". This does not mean they were resident within the baron's demesne, but that they had to be hired with the revenue arising from it.

Conversely, a barony was "over-enfeoffed" where more knights had been enfeoffed than was required by the servitium debitum, and this indicated that the barony had been obtained on overly-favourable terms.

Cartae Baronum
The Cartae Baronum ("Charters of the Barons") was a survey commissioned by the Treasury in 1166. It required each baron to declare how many knights he had enfeoffed and how many were super dominium, with the names of all. It appears that the survey was designed to identify baronies from which a greater servitium debitum could in future be obtained by the king. An example is given from the return of Lambert of Etocquigny:
To his reverend lord, Henry, king of the English, Lambert of Etocquigny, greeting. Know that I hold from you by your favour 16 carucates of land and 2 bovates by the service of 10 knights. In these 16 carucates of land I have 5 knights enfeoffed by the old enfeoffment:
Richard de Haia holds 1 knight's fee; and he withheld the service which he owes to you and to me from the day of your coronation up to now, except that he paid me 2 marks.
Odo de Cranesbi holds 1 knight's fee.
Thomas, son of William, holds 1 knight's fee.
Roger de Millers holds 2 knight's fees.
And from my demesne I provide the balance of the service I owe you, to wit, that of 5 knights. And from that demesne I have given Robert de Portemort  of 1 knight's fee. Therefore I pray you that you will send me your judgement concerning Richard de Haia who holds back the service of his fee, because I cannot obtain that service except by your order. This is the total service in the aforesaid 16 carucates of land. Farewell.

Summons to Parliament
The privilege which balanced the burden of the servitium debitum was the baron's right to attend the king's council. Originally all barons who held per baroniam received individual writs of summons to attend Parliament. This was a practical measure because the early kings almost continually travelled around the kingdom, taking their court (i.e. administration) with them.

A king only called a parliament, or council, when the need arose either for advice or funding. This lack of a parliamentary schedule meant that the barons needed to be informed when and where to attend. As baronies became fragmented over time due to failure of male heirs and descent via co-heiresses (see below), many of those who held per baroniam became holders of relatively small fiefdoms. Eventually, the king refused to summon such minor nobles to Parliament by personal writ, sending instead a general writ of summons to the sheriff of each shire, who was to summon only representatives of these so-called lesser barons. The greater barons, who retained sufficient power to insist upon it, continued to receive personal summonses. The king came to realise, from the complacency of the lesser barons with this new procedure, that in practice it was not tenure per baroniam which determined attendance at Parliament, but receipt of a writ of summons originated by himself.

The next logical development was that the king started issuing writs to persons who did not hold per baroniam and who were not therefore feudal barons, but "barons by writ". The reason for summoning by writ was based on personal characteristics, for example the man summoned might be one of exceptional judgement or have valuable military skills. The arbitrary summons by personal writ signalled the start of the decline of feudalism, eventually evolving into summons by public proclamation in the form of letters patent.

Deemed feudal barons
The higher prelates such as archbishops and bishops were deemed to hold per baroniam, and were thus members of the baronage entitled to attend Parliament, indeed they formed the greatest grouping of all. Marcher lords in Wales often held their lordships by right of conquest and appear to have been deemed feudal barons. The Barons of the Cinque Ports were also deemed feudal barons by virtue of their military service at sea, and were thus entitled to attend Parliament.

Baronial relief
Baronial relief was payable by an heir so that he might lawfully take possession of his inheritance. It was a form of one-off taxation, or more accurately a variety of "feudal incident", levyable by the King on his tenants-in-chief for a variety of reasons. A prospective heir to a barony generally paid £100 in baronial relief for his inheritance. The term "relief" implies "elevation", both words being derived from the Latin levo, to raise up, into a position of honour.

Where a barony was split into two, for example on the death of a baron leaving two co-heiresses, each daughter's husband would become a baron in respect of his moiety (mediaeval French for "half"), paying half of the full baronial relief.  A tenant-in-chief could be the lord of fractions of several different baronies, if he or his ancestors had married co-heiresses. The tenure of even the smallest fraction of a barony conferred baronial status on the lord of these lands. This natural fragmentation of the baronies led to great difficulties within the royal administration as the king relied on an ever-increasing number of men responsible for supplying soldiers for the royal army, and the records of the identities of these fractional barons became more complex and unreliable. The early English jurist Henry de Bracton (died 1268) was one of the first writers to examine the concept of the feudal barony.

Abolition and surviving vestiges

The power of the feudal barons to control their landholding was considerably weakened in 1290 by the statute of Quia Emptores. This prohibited land from being the subject of a feudal grant, and allowed its transfer without the feudal lord's permission.

Feudal baronies became perhaps obsolete (but not extinct) on the abolition of feudal tenure during the Civil War, as confirmed by the Tenures Abolition Act 1660 passed under the Restoration which took away knights service and other legal rights.

Under the Tenures Abolition Act 1660, many baronies by tenure were converted into baronies by writ. The rest ceased to exist as feudal baronies by tenure, becoming baronies in free socage, that is to say under a "free" (hereditable) contract requiring payment of monetary rents. Thus baronies could no longer be held by military service. Parliamentary titles of honour had been limited since the 15th century by the Modus Tenenda Parliamenta act, and could thenceforth only be created by writ of summons or letters patent.

Tenure by knight-service was abolished and discharged and the lands covered by such tenures, including once-feudal baronies, were henceforth held by socage (i.e. in exchange for monetary rents). The English Fitzwalter Case in 1670 ruled that barony by tenure had been discontinued for many years and any claims to a peerage on such basis, meaning a right to sit in the House of Lords, were not to be revived, nor any right of succession based on them. In the Berkeley Case in 1861, an attempt was made to claim a seat in the House of Lords by right of a barony by tenure, but the House of Lords ruled that whatever might have been the case in the past, baronies by tenure no longer existed, meaning that a barony could not be held "by tenure", and confirmed the Tenures Abolition Act 1660. Three Redesdale Committee Reports in the early 19th century reached the same conclusion. 
There has been at least one legal opinion which asserts the continuing legal existence of the feudal barony in England and Wales, namely that from 1996 of A W & C Barsby, Barristers of Grays's Inn.

Geographical survivals
Survivals of feudal baronies, in their geographical form, are the Barony of Westmorland or Appleby, the Barony of Kendal, the Barony of Arundel and the Barony of Abergavenny. The first two terms now describe areas of the historic county of Westmorland, in the same way that the word "county" itself has lost its feudal meaning of a land area under the control of a count or earl.

Lists

Ivor J. Sanders searched the archives, for example Exchequer documents such as fine rolls and pipe rolls, for entries recording the payment of baronial relief and published his results in English Baronies, a Study of their Origin and Descent 1086–1327 (Oxford, 1960). He identified a number of certain baronies where evidence was found of payment of baronial relief, and a further group which he termed "probable baronies" where the evidence was less clear. Where he could not identify a caput, Sanders named the barony after the name of the baron, for example the "Barony of Miles of Gloucester". The following lists include all of Sanders' certain and probable baronies.

For a full comprehensive list of feudal baronies in the 13th century along with earldoms, bishoprics, and archbishoprics see List of nobles and magnates of England in the 13th century.

Certain baronies

Source: Sanders (1960)

Probable baronies

Source, unless otherwise stated: Sanders (1960), pp. 103–151

Others
 Honour of Carisbrooke
Feudal barony of Gloucester
 Honour of Saint Valery
 Honour of Pontefract

Later establishments
 Honour of Aumâle
Honour of Clitheroe
Honour of Grafton

See also

Notes

References

Sources
Sanders, I.J. English Baronies, a Study of their Origin and Descent 1086–1327, Oxford, 1960.
Douglas, David C. & Greenaway, George W., (eds.), English Historical Documents 1042–1189, London, 1959. Part IV, Land & People, C, Anglo-Norman Feudalism, pp. 895–944
Bayeux Tapestry

Further reading

Painter, Sidney. Studies in the History of the English Feudal Barony, Johns Hopkins University, Baltimore, 1943
Madox, Thomas, Baronia Anglica, 1736. 94 vols. History and records of feudal barons.
Sanders, I.J.(ed.), Documents of the Baronial Movement of Reform and Rebellion 1258–67, Selected by R.F. Dugdale, Oxford, 1973
Dugdale, W. The Baronage of England, 2 vols., 1675-6
Nicolas, Nicholas Harris, Synopsis of the Peerage of England, London, 1825, Vol.1, pp.3–12, Baronies by Tenure

Baronies by type
Peerage of England
Barons
Feudalism in England

Honours (feudal barony)
Feudal baronies in Europe
Land tenure